Phalonidia rufoatra is a species of moth of the family Tortricidae. It is found in Costa Rica.

The wingspan is about 10 mm. The ground colour of the forewings is pale ochreous. The hindwings are pale grey.

References

Moths described in 1992
Phalonidia